Wells Creek may refer to:
 Wells Creek, a stream in Whatcom County, Washington
 Wells Creek (Minnesota), a stream in Minnesota
 Wells Creek (Mohawk River), a stream in New York

See also 
Well Creek